TahNibaa Naataanii (born May 5, 1967) is a Native American traditional artist and a member of the Navajo Tribe. She has espoused a belief that creativity should be allowed to be the source of art and that artists should not have to confine themselves to a particular style. Naataanii has also stated that weaving art and tradition should be passed along to present and future generations, with her art techniques and mediums being the traditional form, and artistic style dependent on the artist.

Biography 
Naataanii was born on May 5, 1967 in Shiprock New Mexico to Sarah H. Natani, a weaver. Her paternal grandmother gave her the name TahNibaa Aglohiigiih, which means "TahNibaa the Weaver". By the age of five Naataanii had moved away from her birthplace and was attending kindergarten in Ft. Defiance, Arizona.

She was taught how to weave when she was seven and when she was ten, her family moved to Table Mesa, about 12 miles south from her birthplace. Naataanii continued to weave during the summers up until she finished high school, selling what she wove so she could buy herself new clothes for the next academic year. While attending school Naataanii found it difficult to live with the Biligaana (white people) and Diné (own people) at the same time, often having both cultural and societal forms of living interfering with one another. After completing high school she enlisted in the U.S. Navy. Naataannii has stated that she enlisted because she wanted to travel the country but instead she traveled the world.

Naataanii was unable to weave for five years while she was enlisted and has recalled traveling to countries like the Philippines and Thailand, being in indigenous neighborhoods, and seeing people living like in some reservations where certain technologies and things like running water were not present. Whilst there, she was also able to see weavings from those particular cultures during that time, and even stating she felt a connection with these cultures.

During a brief stint in California, her mother decided to send her weaving supplies and tools and decided to begin weaving again. After acquiring a bachelor's degree in Environmental Management from the Northern New Mexico College, she was offered a position as a bio-scientist, but rejected that opportunity and decided to pursue in order to pursue weaving full time.

During March 2016 she took training from The Business of Indian Agriculture.

Art style and philosophy 
When asked about inspiration and her creative process, Naataanii has stated that the best way to weave is to not stick to the rules or boundaries set by other weaving artists of past generations. Her work has been described as traditional by multiple institutions and artists in that the background behind the piece and patterns used are inspired by aspects of her native culture. Naataanii uses both traditional and non-traditional colors and raises her own sheep, which she sheers to create the dyed yarn used in her art.

Naataanii has espoused a strong determination to keep the Navajo weaving traditions alive and has taught her students, who are of both Native and non-native decent, the importance of taking care of the animals and learning the weaving songs which were once considered essential in the process.

Select artworks 

'''The Mother Earth Shawl (2010)The Mother Earth Shawl piece was created in 2010 by Naataanii. This piece contains the usage of sky blues and reds and displays symmetry.She used traditional mediums such as wool and pigments for dyes to create the red and blue colors.

'''Second Phase Shoulder blanket (2011)

In her Second Phase Shoulder blanket created in 2011. This piece uses traditional mediums such as wool and pigments for dyes. Like most Phase II blankets they had red blocks on the ends and blue stripes going across as well as the use of traditional geometric shapes and patterns such as crosses and blocks.

Spider Woman Shoulder blanket (2011)

Naataanii created her Spider Woman Shoulder Blanket in 2011. She used mediums such as wool and natural pigments to create the dyes used for the piece.

Exhibitions 
On March 6, 2020, an exhibition of Naataanii's work was held at the Heard Museum Indian Fair and Market, alongside other Native American Artists from a variety of different tribes.

Honors and awards 
Throughout the years weaving, Naataanii has won several awards for best pieces, and best shows. She has won such awards in the Santa Fe Fiber Art Show on multiple occasions as well as winning awards in The Heard Museum Indian Fair and Market as well as in the Gallup Intertribal Ceremonial and the Eight Northern Pueblo Arts and Craft Fair.

 NACF Mentor Artist Fellowship, 2017
First place in Traditional Arts, Prescott Indian Art Market, 2018
First place in Contemporary Woven Textiles, Santa Fe Indian Market, 2018
 She is a recipient of a 2022 National Heritage Fellowship awarded by the National Endowment for the Arts, which is the United States government's highest honor in the folk and traditional arts.

References

External links
NEA tribute video, 2022

1967 births
People from Shiprock, New Mexico
Artists from New Mexico
Native American artists
American weavers
Navajo artists
Living people
20th-century Native Americans
21st-century Native Americans
20th-century Native American women
21st-century Native American women
Native American women artists
National Heritage Fellowship winners